Harehill is a village in the civil parish of Boylestone, in the English county of Derbyshire. For transport there is the A515 road nearby.

Nearby settlements 
Nearby settlements include the town of Uttoxeter and the village of Boylestone.

Amenities 
Harehill has a place of worship and a pub.

See also
Listed buildings in Boylestone

References 
Philip's Street Atlas Derbyshire (page 213)

Villages in Derbyshire
Derbyshire Dales